The 1985 Volta a Catalunya was the 65th edition of the Volta a Catalunya cycle race and was held from 4 September to 11 September 1985. The race started in Llançà and finished in Salou. The race was won by Robert Millar of the Peugeot team.

General classification

References

1985
Volta
1985 in Spanish road cycling
September 1985 sports events in Europe
1985 Super Prestige Pernod International